Rettenstein is a part of the town St. Johann im Pongau in Salzburg (state), Austria.

See also
 Salzburgerland
 St. Johann im Pongau
 Salzburg

Cities and towns in St. Johann im Pongau District